Alain Krivine (10 July 1941 – 12 March 2022) was a French Trotskyist leader.

Early life 
Krivine was born in July 1941 in Paris, France, the child of Pierre Léon Georges Krivine, a stomatologist, and Esther Lautman, the sister of French Resistance fighter Albert Lautman. The Krivine family originally came from Ukraine, having fled to France during the antisemitic pogroms of the Russian Empire in the 19th century.

Career 
Krivine was one of the leaders of the May 1968 revolt in Paris, and was the last of the generation radicalised in the 1960s to serve on the political bureau of the LCR. He was the candidate of the LCR at the French presidential election of 1969, getting 1.05% of the votes.

He was a member of the Revolutionary Communist League (LCR), which is the French section of the reunified Fourth International. He was a member of the LCR's political bureau until March 2006, when he resigned from that committee. He was a member of the European Parliament from 1999 to 2004.

Later in 2006, he wrote an autobiography titled "Ça te passera avec l’age."

Death 
Krivine died on 12 March 2022 in Paris, at the age of 80.

References

Further reading 
  Alain Krivine quitte le bureau politique de la LCR - Article in Le Monde on his resignation. 4 March 2006.

1941 births
2022 deaths
French twins
Burials at Père Lachaise Cemetery
20th-century French politicians
21st-century French politicians
French Trotskyists
May 1968 events in France
MEPs for France 1999–2004
New Anticapitalist Party politicians
Revolutionary Communist League (France) MEPs
Revolutionary Communist League (France) politicians
Workers' Struggle MEPs
Lycée Condorcet alumni
University of Paris alumni
Politicians from Paris
French people of Ukrainian-Jewish descent
Candidates in the 1974 French presidential election